Xu Xingye (1917 – 1990) was a Chinese novelist. One of his works, Broken Golden Bowl, won the Mao Dun Literature Prize, a prestigious literature award in China.

Biography
Xu was born in Shaoxing, Zhejiang in 1917. He graduated from Wuxi Academy of the Traditional Chinese Culture in 1937. After graduation, he worked in Shanghai.

Xu started to publish works in 1980. He died in Shanghai in 1990.

Works

Novels
 Broken Golden Bowl

Awards
 Broken Golden Bowl – 3rd Mao Dun Literature Prize (1991)

Personal life
Xu married Zhou Yunqin, her father was Zhou Zongliang, a rich merchant in Shanghai. The couple had two sons, Xu Yuanzhang and Xu Yuanjian.

References

1917 births
1990 deaths
Writers from Shaoxing
20th-century novelists
Mao Dun Literature Prize laureates
Chinese male novelists
20th-century Chinese male writers